In the mathematical discipline of graph theory, the expander walk sampling theorem intuitively states that sampling vertices in an expander graph by doing relatively short random walk can simulate sampling the vertices independently from a uniform distribution.

Statement
Let   be an n-vertex expander graph with positively weighted edges, and let . Let  denote the vertices encountered in a -step random walk on  starting at vertex , and let  . Where 

The theorem states that for a weighted graph  and a random walk  where  is chosen by an initial distribution ,  for all , we have the following bound:

Proof
In order to prove the theorem, we provide a few definitions followed by three lemmas.

Let  be the matrix with entries , and let . 

Then:

Where . Let  and  be the first and second largest eigenvalue of  respectively. 

Lemma 1

Proof:

By Markov’s inequality,

Where  is the expectation of  chosen according to the probability distribution . As this can be interpreted by summing over all possible trajectories , hence:

Combining the two results proves the lemma.

Lemma 2

For ,

Proof:

Lemma 3

If  is a real number such that ,

Proof summary:

We Taylor expand  about point  to get:

We show that  We then prove that (i)  by matrix manipulation, and then prove (ii) using (i) and Cauchy’s estimate from complex analysis. 

The results combine to show that 

A line to line proof can be found in Gilman (1998)
Proof of theorem

Combining lemma 2 and lemma 3, we get that

A similar bound

holds, hence setting  gives the desired result.

Uses
This theorem is useful in randomness reduction in the study of derandomization. Sampling from an expander walk is an example of a randomness-efficient sampler. Such families exist and are efficiently constructible, e.g. the Ramanujan graphs of Lubotzky-Phillips-Sarnak.

References

 
 
 

Sampling (statistics)